Kronos is an operating system with time-sharing capabilities, written by Control Data Corporation in 1971.  Kronos ran on the 60-bit CDC 6000 series mainframe computers and their successors.  CDC replaced Kronos with the NOS operating system in the late 1970s, which were succeeded by the NOS/VE operating system in the mid-1980s.

The MACE operating system and APEX were forerunners to KRONOS.  It was written by Control Data systems programmer Greg Mansfield, Dave Cahlander, Bob Tate and three others.

See also
 CDC SCOPE

References

KRONOS
Discontinued operating systems
Time-sharing operating systems